Fertiliser Township is a monorail station of Mumbai Monorail. It was opened to the public on 2 February 2014, as part of the first phase of Line 1. It serves Marouli area, Wadavli village, Tolaram Nagar and Camp(E) of Eastern Mumbai. It connects to Vivekananda Education Society.

References

Mumbai Monorail stations
Railway stations in India opened in 2014